Peter Sidoli (born 10 June 1980) is a Welsh rugby union player. A lock forward, he played for Neath RFC and Ebbw Vale RFC before joining Newport Gwent Dragons. In 2008 he joined Italian club Rugby Calvisano. He is a former Wales Under-21 international but nationalised to play for his father's native Italy if selected. In May 2004 Sidoli was called up to the senior Wales squad, but was ultimately not capped at that level.

He is the brother of Welsh international Robert Sidoli.

References

External links
Newport Gwent Dragons profile

1980 births
Living people
Dragons RFC players
Ebbw Vale RFC players
Italian British rugby union players
Neath RFC players
Rugby union locks
Rugby union players from Merthyr Tydfil
Welsh people of Italian descent
Welsh rugby union players